"The Watcher" is a song by American hip hop musician Dr. Dre from his second studio album 2001. It was released as the fourth and final single from the album in France on February 27, 2001. "The Watcher" features vocals from rappers Eminem and Knoc-turn'al, who sing the hook and Dj cuts after 2nd hook by Flash Technology. The song talks about Dre's rap career and what he's been through. It also mentions former N.W.A bandmate Eazy-E & his death.

Rapper Jay-Z released a sequel titled "The Watcher 2" on his 2002 album The Blueprint 2: The Gift & The Curse. Jay-Z's version was produced by Dr. Dre and featured vocals from Dr. Dre, Jay-Z and Aftermath associates Rakim and Truth Hurts.

A year later in 2003, Dr. Dre, Snoop Dogg and Rakim would release another version called "The Watcher Pt. 3" on the mixtape DJ Jam presents WBALLZ 187.4 FM Vol. 1.

The track on the B-side "Bad Guys Always Die" featuring Eminem originally appeared on the soundtrack to the 1999 Will Smith film Wild Wild West. It was also on the expanded edition of Em's album The Slim Shady LP.

One of Dr. Dre's lines was later interpolated as the chorus for the song "Hello", a song by him, former N.W.A members Ice Cube and MC Ren.

Track listing
CD single (France)

Charts

Sequels

"The Watcher 2"

A sequel to the song was released in 2002 and titled "The Watcher 2". The song is a sequel to "The Watcher" and is performed by American rappers Jay-Z, Dr. Dre, Rakim and R&B singer Truth Hurts. The song was featured on Jay-Z's album The Blueprint 2: The Gift & The Curse. Jay-Z performs the first verse. During it he shouts out fellow Roc-A-Fella associates Damon Dash and Kareem Burke, mentions Robb Report and references the Eric B. & Rakim song "Eric B. Is President". This is then followed on by Truth Hurts' bridge and the hook, with the same lyrics as the original hook sang by Eminem. This then bring Dre's verse, which begins with a similar pattern to Dre's song "Still D.R.E.". The third verse is performed by Rakim. He references his opening line on "Lyrics of Fury", from the Eric B. & Rakim album Follow the Leader. Rakim told Who that the song was originally intended to be a Dr. Dre project: "That was a Dre project, man. A joint that I did for Dre. Jay-Z heard it and the rest is history, man.".

"The Watcher Pt. 3"

A prequel to the song was released in 2003 and was titled "The Watcher Pt. 3". The song is performed by American rappers Snoop Dogg, Dr. Dre and Rakim. The song is a part of the DJ Jam mixtape WBallz 187.4 FM Vol. 1 which is hosted by Snoop Dogg (under his moniker Bigg Snoop Dogg). On vinyl releases of the mixtape, the whole song can be heard however on the CD version of the mixtape, the last verse cannot be heard. The first verse is a freestyle rap by Snoop Dogg, in which he says not to confuse him with rapper Lil' Bow Wow by saying: "And I'm not the little one, I'm the Big Bow Wow". Whilst every other aspect is original to this song, the hook, Dr. Dre's verse, Rakim's verse and the instrumental are from "The Watcher 2".

References

1999 songs
2001 singles
Dr. Dre songs
Song recordings produced by Dr. Dre
Aftermath Entertainment singles
Interscope Records singles
Knoc-turn'al songs
Songs written by Dr. Dre
Songs written by Eminem
Gangsta rap songs